Bilel Gontassi (born 3 January 1983) is a Tunisian football midfielder.

References

1983 births
Living people
Tunisian footballers
CA Bizertin players
EGS Gafsa players
AS Gabès players
ES Zarzis players
Association football midfielders
Tunisian Ligue Professionnelle 1 players